Sanjjanaa Galrani is an Indian model and actress who made her film debut in the 2005 Telugu film Soggadu. She is known for her role in the Kannada film Ganda Hendathi (2006). She played a supporting role in the 2008 Telugu film Bujjigadu starring Prabhas. In 2017, she played Chandri in the Kannada crime drama Dandupalya 2.

Early life
Brought up in Bangalore, Galrani is of Sindhi origin. When she was doing her PUC, she received her first modelling offer. She continued her studies while working as a part-time model. She appeared in over 60 television advertisements, the most notable being a Fastrack advertisement with John Abraham. She has a sister, Nikki Galrani, who is also an actress.

Career

Debut (2005)

After appearing in advertisements and as child artist in roles in the films Soggadu and Panduranga Vittala, she got her first starring role in Ganda Hendathi. 

Her first release, however, was the Tamil feature film, Oru Kadhal Seiveer. S R Ashok Kumar of The Hindu noted that Galrani, then credited under her birth name, was "very beautiful but has to work on her acting".

Ganda Hendathi, a Kannada remake of the Hindi film Murder (2004), itself an adaptation of the Hollywood film Unfaithful (2002). The film was released in Telugu as Mogudu Pellam O Boy Friend. While Sify wrote, "Sanjjanaa has made a decent debut and she is extremely daring and does justice to her role".

In 2008, she made her official Telugu film debut in Puri Jagannadh's Bujjigadu, in which she played the role of Kangana alongside Prabhas and Trisha Krishnan. Although this was a supporting role, it gained her considerable attention and popularity. In 2010, she was seen in the Telugu film Police Police, which was followed by a cameo role in Huduga Hudugi. Her final release of that year was Mylari with Shivrajkumar, in which she played a journalist and was featured in a special song opposite Shivrajkumar. The film's success gained her offers in Kannada cinema. She won the Bangalore Times Award for Best Actor in a Negative Role Female in 2012 for I Am Sorry Mathe Banni Preethsona.

In January 2012, she played one of the lead female roles in Casanova, her maiden Malayalam venture. Reportedly the costliest Malayalam production of all time, and co-starring Mohanlal and Shriya Saran, the film saw Galrani portray a salsa dancer. Director Rosshan Andrrews signed her for the particular role, since she was trained in salsa. Her last release is her second Malayalam film, the Shaji Kailas directed The King & the Commissioner, co-starring Mammooty and Suresh Gopi. Later in 2012 she appeared in films including Narasimha, Ondu Kshanadalli, Sagar, all of which being Kannada projects, and Yamaho Yama.

In 2013 she appeared in Jagan Nirdoshi in Telugu which was made under Padmalaya Films and in Mahanadhi in Kannada, which was her first heroine-centric film. She was then seen in Nenem…Chinna Pillana? She is currently filming for a Telugu film, Saradha, directed by RP Patnaik.

Controversy
Galrani was arrested by the Central Crime Branch (CCB) of the Karnataka Police on 8 September 2020 in connection with the investigation into the drug racket involving the Kannada film industry. She is the second actor to be arrested by the CCB after Ragini Dwivedi. Her bail application was denied several times by the courts, with the CCB claiming that she has admitted to being part of the drug racket. She was later granted bail after spending 3 months in prison.

Personal life
She secretly married a Bangalore-based vascular surgeon Azeez Pasha in intimate function.

Filmography

Film

Web series
2020 : Shit Happens (Telugu)
2019: Aivar (Tamil)

Television
 Sanjana was a contestant on Bigg Boss Kannada in its debut season. 
 Smart Show (Malayalam game show)
 Sixth Sense Kannada (Kannada game show)
 Sixth Sense (Telugu game show)
 Swarna Khadgam/Illayathalapathy as Queen Mahadatri. Produced by Arka Media Works and directed by Yata Satya Narayana.
 Galrani was a contestant of the Hindi reality TV show Mujhse Shaadi Karoge.

Awards
 Best Actor in a Negative Role Female for Mathe Banni Preethsona – The Bangalore Times Film Awards 2011
 In 2015, she entered into the Limca Book of World Records by cycling for 104 hours.
 She was given the Celebrity Social Media Icon 2016 award by GMASA.

References

External links

 
 

1983 births
Living people
Actresses from Bangalore
Female models from Bangalore
Sindhi people
Indian film actresses
Indian television actresses
Indian web series actresses
Actresses in Telugu cinema
Actresses in Kannada cinema
Actresses in Tamil cinema
Actresses in Malayalam cinema
Actresses in Telugu television
Bigg Boss Kannada contestants
Salsa dancers
Indian prisoners and detainees
Prisoners and detainees of India
21st-century Indian actresses